Yury Stadolnik (born 1 March 1983) is a Belarusian former professional footballer. As of 2014, he works as a coach in FC Gomel.

External links

1988 births
Living people
Belarusian footballers
Association football defenders
FC Veino players
FC Gorki players
FC Torpedo Mogilev players
FC Dnepr Mogilev players
FC Gomel players
FC DSK Gomel players
FC Lokomotiv Gomel players
People from Mogilev
Sportspeople from Mogilev Region